Mildred Mary Ratcliffe FSSI (1899–1988) was an English painter, commercial artist & calligrapher, known for her poster designs for the Post Office Savings Bank.

Biography
Ratcliffe was born on 17 October 1899 in Rochester, Kent as the second of Alfred and Rose Ratcliffe's seven children, and was educated by a governess, before attending Rochester Grammar School for Girls.

Upon leaving school Ratcliffe took up a position as a wages clerk with the Civil Service, at Chatham Dockyard. Approximately four years later, she became a clerical officer with the Post Office Savings Bank, at Hammersmith. In the mid-1920s she transferred to their new publicity unit, spending the rest of her career there designing posters and other promotional material. She also designed the bank's annual Christmas card for members of the Royal family.

In 1950 Ratcliffe scribed and illuminated, in gold, a 'Book of Acknowledgement', for the Benenden Civil Service Chest Hospital's Appeal Fund. The book was presented to Queen Elizabeth on 6 July 1950, when she opened the hospital. She also lettered two books of remembrance for St Mark's Church, Surbiton.

She exhibited at two Royal Academy of Arts summer exhibitions and was appointed a Fellow of the Society of Scribes and Illuminators (FSSI).

For most of her life, Ratcliffe lived alone in a flat in West Kensington, London, before retiring to a cottage at 1, Mill Street, Loose, Kent in 1959. In retirement, she joined and exhibited with the Maidstone Art Society, served as life vice-president of the Civil Service Arts Club, and acted as art tutor to local children.

Ratcliffe died on 19 October 1988. Her funeral took place at All Saints' Church, Loose. Examples of her work are in the collections of the Imperial War Museums, The Postal Museum, The National Archives, and Maidstone Museum & Art Gallery.

Maidstone Art Society award a Mildred Ratcliffe Prize for 'Best in Show' at their annual exhibition.

References

External links 
 Wherever You Go There is a Post Office, Post Office Savings Bank booklet, featuring Ratcliffe's painting of the Post Office at Biddenden
 Ratcliffe's painting of West Wycombe, in a Tweet by the Postal Museum
 Facsimile of the Benenden book

1890s births
1988 deaths
20th-century English women artists
20th-century English painters
20th-century calligraphers
English calligraphers
People from Rochester, Kent
People educated at Rochester Grammar School
English illustrators
Fellows of the Society of Scribes and Illuminators
People from Kensington
People from Loose, Kent